The Eastern Busway is a bus-only road running from the University of Queensland's St Lucia campus to Langlands Park busway station in Queensland, Australia.

Development
The Eastern Busway was built and opened in stages. The first section between the University of Queensland and the South East Busway opened in August 2009 and the Buranda to Main Avenue section in August 2011.

UQ Lakes to Buranda section

Construction began in April 2007 on the  UQ Lakes to Buranda section with it opening on 3 August 2009. The UQ Lakes to Buranda section of the busway was built under an alliance with Thiess, Sinclair Knight Merz and the Department of Transport and Main Roads. It included a  tunnel built under the old Boggo Road Gaol. Tunnelling was done with a Voest-Alpine Industrieanlagenbau AM105 roadheader machine. A second tunnel passes under the Pacific Motorway to connect with the South East Busway at Buranda.

Fatality during construction
On 1 December 2008, a worker was killed in an accident during construction of the section near the Princess Alexandra Hospital. The accident occurred when an 18 tonne concrete bridge beam fell from its pier supports.

The accident led to the suspension of construction for several days and charges being laid against construction contractor Theiss in relation to alleged breaches of the Workplace Health and Safety Act. This death was the only recorded construction-related fatality on the busway network to date.

Buranda to Coorparoo sections
In June 2008, the Queensland Government approved the project's Concept Design and Impact Management Plan. The Concept Design and Impact Management Plan projects for a long-term investment in the future of the eastern suburbs.

The Government committed $466 million for the next section of the Eastern Busway. This funding included 96 property resumptions between Buranda and Cavendish Road, Coorparoo and construction of the  section between the South East Busway and Main Avenue, Coorparoo with stations at Stones Corner and Langlands Park.

In December 2008, the Queensland Government announced the Eastern Busway Alliance of Leighton Contractors, Sinclair Knight Merz, Maunsell and AECOM to build this section.

The Buranda to Main Avenue section connects the existing South East Busway at Buranda with Coorparoo via Stones Corner. Busway stations have been built at Stones Corner and Langlands Park.

Department of Transport and Main Roads compulsorily resumed the Myer building for Eastern Busway project on 31 July 2009. Construction work on the section commenced in August 2009.  The Coorparoo bus station and busway proposed at the Myer building are not built.  The section opened on 29 August 2011.

Further extensions
Further stages of the Eastern Busway are ready for immediate delivery, should funding become available under the Australian Government's Infrastructure Australia program.
The Queensland Government's Transport and Main Roads Department has stated that [quote] Planning for the ultimate Eastern Busway between Main Avenue, Coorparoo and Capalaba is currently being revised, with further stages subject to funding and government priorities. Busways - Department of Transport and Main Roads

The department is  developing cost-effective short and medium term options on  Old Cleveland Road, including intersection upgrades to allow for bus priority. It is proposed to extend the Eastern Busway along the Old Cleveland Road corridor via the suburbs of Coorparoo, Camp Hill, Carina, Carindale and Chandler to Capalaba. Historically, the Old Cleveland Road corridor was a major tram route until closure of Brisbane's tram network in 1969.

Stations
Busway stations on the Eastern Busway currently include:
UQ Lakes
Boggo Road
Princess Alexandra Hospital
Buranda
Stones Corner
Langlands Park

Major proposed stations on the busway include:
a new station underneath the old Myer building at Coorparoo
a new station at Carindale busway station near Westfield Carindale
the existing Sleeman Centre park & ride facility at Chandler
the existing Capalaba bus station

Road access to the busway is available at Dutton Park, Buranda (via the South East Busway and O'Keefe Street) and Langlands Park (via Old Cleveland Road and Main Avenue).

Boggo Road Station platform numbering
Boggo Road busway station is located alongside the Park Road railway station. The busway platforms are listed as Platform 5 (toward Buranda) and 6 (toward UQ Lakes) to align with the existing platforms at Park Road station. This may cause confusion to busway users as on each other station in the Busway network, inbound (toward city) traffic is designated Platform 1 while outbound (away from city) traffic is designated Platform 2.

Services
All services on the busway are operated by Brisbane Transport.

References

External links

Bus rapid transit in Australia
Busways
Public transport in Brisbane
Transport infrastructure completed in 2009
2009 establishments in Australia